Vilayet Aghayev (born 5 December 1971) is an Azerbaijani wrestler. He competed in the 1996 Summer Olympics.

References

External links
 

1971 births
Living people
Wrestlers at the 1996 Summer Olympics
Azerbaijani male sport wrestlers
Olympic wrestlers of Azerbaijan
20th-century Azerbaijani people